Sphenophorus robustus is a species of beetle in the family Dryophthoridae. It is found in North America.

Subspecies
These two subspecies belong to the species Sphenophorus robustus:
 Sphenophorus robustus rectistriatus Chittenden
 Sphenophorus robustus robustus

References

Further reading

 
 

Dryophthorinae
Articles created by Qbugbot
Beetles described in 1873